River of Stories is a graphic novel written and illustrated by Indian artist Orijit Sen. Often considered India's first graphic novel, it tells the story of the environmental, social and political issues surrounding the construction of the controversial Narmada Dam. It was published in 1994 with the help of a small grant from an NGO.

Two years after it was first published i.e. in 1996 it went out of print. But is being released in a new edition by Blaft Publications in 2022, with a foreword by Arundhati Roy.

Author
Orijit studied graphic design at the National Institute of Design (NID). River of Stories was one of his earliest works. He subsequently went on to do many shorter comics for magazines like Chimurenga. He is one of the co-founders of People Tree, a collaborative studio and store for artists, designers and craftspeople based in Delhi and Goa. He is also a co-founder of the Pao Collective of graphic artists and chief editor of 'Comixense'—a comics quarterly for young readers. His artwork has been exhibited in India, the United Kingdom, and Russia.

Characters
 Vishnu
 Kujum Chantu
 Relku
 Anand
 Malgu Gayan

See also
Indian comics

References

External links
River of Stories - GraphicShelf
Orijit sen - an article from Tree People
Orijit Sen in Conversation with Amitabh Kumar
Graphic artists among the highlights of Indian Summer

1994 graphic novels
Indian graphic novels